Herbert Hartland Lytle (July 9, 1874 – March 4, 1932) was an American racecar driver.

Biography
Herbert Lytle was born in Malone, New York on July 9, 1874. He began racing automobiles circa 1900, and first teamed-up with James Bates, who became his riding mechanic. He competed in multiple racing venues and won a 50-mile race at the Atlanta Motordorome, which was a 2-mile dirt race course.

Lytle was the only American driver to finish the Gordon Bennett Cup races in France in 1905.

Herbert Lytle died in Warsaw, Indiana on March 4, 1932.  His wife Josephine Della J. Leer Lytle died the following day, at the age of 36. They both died of pneumonia. A dual funeral service was conducted on March 7, 1932. He was previously married to Gertrude Fannie Harbord Lytle, who predeceased him on May 23, 1926.

Indy 500 results

References

1874 births
1932 deaths
Indianapolis 500 drivers
People from Malone, New York
Racing drivers from New York (state)
Deaths from pneumonia in Indiana